Angel Guzman (born 20 April 1953) is a Mexican sports shooter. He competed in the mixed skeet event at the 1984 Summer Olympics.

References

1953 births
Living people
Mexican male sport shooters
Olympic shooters of Mexico
Shooters at the 1984 Summer Olympics
Place of birth missing (living people)
20th-century Mexican people